The 1500 meters distance for women in the 2014–15 ISU Speed Skating World Cup was contested over six races on six occasions, out of a total of seven World Cup occasions for the season, with the first occasion taking place in Obihiro, Japan, on 14–16 November 2014, and the final occasion taking place in Erfurt, Germany, on 21–22 March 2015.

The defending champion was Ireen Wüst of the Netherlands. Wüst's compatriot Marrit Leenstra won the cup, while Wüst had to settle for fourth place.

Top three

Race medallists

Standings 
Standings as of 21 March 2015 (end of the season).

References 

 
Women 1500